Prowsville is an unincorporated community in Jefferson Township, Washington County, in the U.S. state of Indiana.

History
A post office was established at Prowsville in 1855, and remained in operation until 1868. The community was named after the Prow family of settlers.

Geography

References

Unincorporated communities in Washington County, Indiana
Unincorporated communities in Indiana